Living with the Dead (released in Europe as Talking to Heaven) is a 2002 American made-for-television supernatural crime drama film directed by Stephen Gyllenhaal and starring Ted Danson, Diane Ladd, Queen Latifah, Mary Steenburgen and Jack Palance. It was inspired by the life of medium James Van Praagh. The film first aired on CBS in the U.S. and was later rated PG-13.

In the United States, the film was released as Living with the Dead; the working title was Talking to Heaven, and this was also the release title in Europe.

Plot
Seven dead boys are trying to communicate through James (Ted Danson), to tell their story of how they died, and how their murderer is still out there. James agrees to work alongside the detective investigating the murders, and discovers who murdered the seven boys.

Cast

Production
The movie was filmed in Vancouver, British Columbia, Canada.

References

External links 
 
 
 

2002 television films
2002 films
2000s crime drama films
2002 fantasy films
American crime drama films
CBS network films
Films directed by Stephen Gyllenhaal
Films scored by Normand Corbeil
American serial killer films
Films shot in Vancouver
American drama television films
2000s English-language films
2000s American films